Chongqing Suburban Railway is a commuter rail transit system in construction in Chongqing, China. According to the Comprehensive Transport Plan of Chongqing Main City Zone, the system will have a total of 14 lines.

Lines under construction

Lines planned

See also 
 Chongqing Rail Transit

References

Notes 

Transport in Chongqing
Chongqing Rail Transit
Rail transport in Chongqing